Jørgen Gluver (born 15 June 1960) is a former Danish handball player who competed in the 1984 Summer Olympics. He played his club handball with HIK Håndbold. In 1984 he finished fourth with the Danish team in the Olympic tournament. He played all six matches and scored nine goals.

References

1960 births
Living people
Danish male handball players
Olympic handball players of Denmark
Handball players at the 1984 Summer Olympics